(5645) 1990 SP is an eccentric and tumbling asteroid, classified as near-Earth object of the Apollo group, approximately 1.7 kilometers in diameter. It was discovered on 20 September 1990, by Scottish–Australian astronomer Robert McNaught at the Siding Spring Observatory in Canberra, Australia. Scientists have said that it has a '1 in 364 billion chance' of colliding with the Earth.

Orbit and classification 

The asteroid orbits the Sun at a distance of 0.8–1.9 AU once every 1 years and 7 months (576 days). Its orbit has an eccentricity of 0.39 and an inclination of 14° with respect to the ecliptic.

Close approaches 

It also makes close approaches to Mars. On 14 April 1969, it passed the Red Planet at only .

Precovery 

Published by the Digitized Sky Survey (DSS), a first precovery was taken at the discovering observatory in 1974, extending the asteroid's observation arc by 16 years prior to its discovery.

Physical characteristics 

The stony S-type asteroid is also characterized as a P-type, based on post-cryogenic observations by the Spitzer Space Telescope, while observations at the NASA Infrared Telescope Facility using its SpeX instrument during a follow-up campaign of the Spitzer-observed objects between 2009 and 2012, gave it a C/X/T spectral type.

Rotation 

In April 2002, Czech astronomer Petr Pravec obtained a rotational lightcurve from a photometric observations, which gave a relatively long period of  hours with a brightness variation of 0.7 in magnitude. The observations have also shown that the body is most likely in a tumbling motion.

Diameter and albedo 

Estimates for the body's diameter range from 1.6 to 2.2 kilometers with an albedo for its surface between 0.06 and 0.12, according to observations made by the NEOWISE mission of NASA's Wide-field Infrared Survey Explorer and by the Spitzer Space Telescope. The Collaborative Asteroid Lightcurve Link takes the revised WISE data – an albedo of 0.0872 and a diameter of 1.65 kilometers – as the best of all available results.

References

External links 
 Asteroid Lightcurve Database (LCDB), query form (info )
 Dictionary of Minor Planet Names, Google books
 Asteroids and comets rotation curves, CdR – Observatoire de Genève, Raoul Behrend
 
 
 

005645
Discoveries by Robert H. McNaught
19900920